Ghalib (Arabic: غالب ghālib) is an Arabic masculine given name which generally means "to overcome, to defeat", also meaning "successor, victor". It may also be a surname and refer several notable people:

Surname

 Asadulla Al Galib (born 1998), Bangladeshi cricketer
 Muhammad Asadullah Al-Ghalib (born 1948), Bangladeshi Islamic scholar and academic
 Umar Arteh Ghalib (1930–), Somali politician and former prime minister of Somalia
 Sharif Ghalib (1961–), current Deputy Permanent Representative of Afghanistan to the  United Nations Office at Geneva and Deputy Chief of Mission of the Embassy of Afghanistan in Bern, Switzerland
 Ghalib (1797–1869) also known as Mirza Asadullah Baig Khan was a famous Urdu poet. His honorific was Dabir-ul-Mulk and Najm-ud-Daula.

Given name

 Ghālib ibn ʿAbd al-Raḥmān (c.900–981), Andalusi military commander
 Ghalib Bin Ali (1912–2009), last elected Imam of the Ibadi sect in Oman
 Ghalib Efendi, former Sharif of Hejaz 
 Ghalib Shiraz Dhalla, Los Angeles-based novelist
 Ghaleb Zu'bi (born 1943), Jordanian lawyer and politician

Epithet 
 Al-Ghalib billah also known as Muhammad ibn Ahmad al-Qadir, was the son of Al-Qadir (r. 991–1031) and elder brother of Al-Qa'im (r. 1031–1075). He was nominated heir in 1001.
 Al-Ghalib Billah (Arabic: الْغَالِبُ بِالله al-ghālibu billah; "The Victor by the Grace of Allah [God]") or simply Al-Ghalib (Arabic: الْغَالِب al-ghālib), the honorific epithet of founder and Sultan Muhammad I of Granada of the Nasrid Dynasty of Emirate of Granada